Ian is a common given name, the Scottish Gaelic version of the name John.

Ian or IAN may also refer to:

 IAN, the inferior alveolar nerve (biology)
 IAN, IATA airport code for Bob Baker Memorial Airport (Kiana, Alaska)
 -ian, a suffix meaning member of or resident of, e.g., Virginian or Wikipedian
 International Article Number (IAN)
 Internet area network (IAN)
 "Ian", a song by White Town from Socialism, Sexism & Sexuality
 List of storms named Ian

See also
 IANS (disambiguation)